Enable or Enabling can refer to one of the following:
 Enabling, a term in psychotherapy and mental health
 Enabling technology, an invention or innovation, that can be applied to drive radical change in the capabilities of a user or culture
 Enabling act, a piece of legislation by which a legislative body grants an entity  power to take certain actions
 Enabling Act of 1802, authorized the residents of the eastern portion of the Northwest Territory to form the state of Ohio and join the United States
 Enabling Act of 1889, a United States statute that enabled North Dakota, South Dakota, Montana, and Washington to form state governments and to gain admission as states of the union.
 Oklahoma Enabling Act, a 1906 law which empowered the people residing in Indian Territory and Oklahoma Territory to elect delegates to a state constitutional convention and subsequently to be admitted to the union as a single state
 Standard State Zoning Enabling Act, a 1922 model law for U.S. states to enable zoning regulations in their jurisdictions
 Enabling Act of 1933 (Ermächtigungsgesetz),  a 1933 Weimar constitutional amendment that gave the German Cabinet the power to enact laws without the involvement of the Reichstag
 Rules Enabling Act, a 1934 act of Congress that gave the judicial branch the power to promulgate the Federal Rules of Civil Procedure
 Enabling clause, a clause in the 1979 Tokyo Round of the General Agreement on Tariffs and Trade (GATT)
 Enabling transformation, a compiler optimization that increases the effectiveness of other compiler optimizations
 Enabling Unit, Equal Opportunity Cell based at University College of Medical Sciences and Guru Teg Bahadur Hospital, Delhi

Enable can also refer to:
 Enable Software, Inc., a defunct software company located in Ballston Lake, New York
 EnABLE software, software used in the oil and gas industry
 Geo-enable, the integrated use of Geographic Information
 Enable, Limpopo, a town in the Limpopo province of South Africa
 ENABLE Scotland, a Scottish charity that supports people with learning disabilities
 Enable Ireland, an Irish non-profit organisation providing free services to people with disabilities and their families
 Enable (horse), a thoroughbred racehorse, twice winner of the Prix de l'Arc de Triomphe
 Enable magazine, launched in May 2011 by Glasgow-based magazine publishers DC Publishing (enablemagazine.co.uk)